Euxanthe madagascariensis is a butterfly in the family Nymphalidae first described by Hippolyte Lucas in 1843. It is found on Madagascar. The habitat consists of forests.

References

Butterflies described in 1843
Charaxinae